A power inverter is a device that converts direct current to alternating current.

Inverter may also refer to

 Inverter (logic gate) or NOT gate, a device that performs a logical operation
 Inverter air conditioner, a type of air conditioner that uses a power inverter to vary the speed of the compressor motor to continuously regulate temperature
 Impedance inverter, a device that produces the mathematical inverse of an electrical impedance—see Quarter-wave impedance transformer

See also 
 Inverse (disambiguation)
 Inversion (disambiguation)
 Rectifier
 Thyristor
 HVDC converter station - A device that converts AC power to and from high voltage DC